CSS Alabamas Gulf of Mexico Expeditionary Raid commenced shortly after the Confederate States Navy ship  left Bermuda and the Atlantic coast and cruised south toward the island of Dominica in the Caribbean Sea near the Gulf of Mexico. The raid lasted from about the middle of November 1862 to the end of January 1863.

The primary area of operation during this expeditionary raid, was the southern seaboard of the United States starting from Dominica then ranging up along Cuba and to Galveston, Texas before finally heading south again toward Jamaica.

Raid overview
CSS Alabama worked its way down the east coast of Florida during the month of November to Martinique to rendezvous with her supply vessel, CSS Agrippina, and ran into , narrowly escaping the Union warship. CSS Alabama then made her way to Texas to help defend the state from invasion from General Banks Expedition, and fought  in the action off Galveston Light naval battle, before escaping to the South Atlantic.

From this raiding area off the coast of New England, CSS Alabama made her way into the Caribbean Sea and the Gulf of Mexico to continue her unhindered wrecking of enemy commerce along the North American coastline.

Raid bounty

References
 Hearn, Chester G., Gray Raiders of the Sea, Louisiana State Press, 1996. 
 Luraghi, Raimondo, A History of the Confederate Navy, U.S. Naval Institute Press, 1996. 

Gulf of Mexico Expeditionary Raid